Abu al-Muẓaffar Yusuf ibn Muhammad al-Muqtafi (1124 – 20 December 1170) better known by his regnal name al-Mustanjid bi-llah was the Abbasid caliph in Baghdad from 1160 to 1170. He was the son of previous Caliph al-Muqtafi.

Biography 
Al-Mustanjid was born in 1124. He was the son of caliph al-Muqtafi and his mother was an Umm walad named Thawus. His full name was Yusuf ibn Muhammad al-Muqtafi and his Kunya was Abu al-Muzaffar. When Yusuf was a young  prince his father became Caliph in 1136. His father ruled for almost twenty-four years until his death in 1160. When his father died, he ascended to the throne. He continued the policies of his father and he also confirmed Awn al-Din ibn Hubayra as his vizier. Awn al-Din had previously served as the vizier to his father. Awn al-Din's Tenure marked the final decline of the Seljuq influence in the Abbasid court (cf. Abbasid–Seljuk war), and saw a flowering of Hanbali learning in Baghdad. Ibn Hubayra was also involved in the conquest of Fatimid Egypt by Nur ad-Din Zangi.

One of al-Muqtafi's wives, al-Mustanjid's stepmother, wanted her own son to succeed.  She gained over many amirs to her side, and had their slave-girls armed with daggers to kill the new caliph. Al-Mustanjid discovered the plot and placed the rebel son and mother in prison.

Around this time, Fatimid dynasty was at last extinguished, having lasted for 260 years. Their conqueror, Saladin, though himself an orthodox Muslim, initially didn't proclaim the Sunni faith in the midst of a people still devoted to the tenets and practice of the Shi'a sect. But he soon found himself able to do so; and thus the spiritual supremacy of the Abbasids again prevailed, not only in Syria, but throughout Egypt and all its dependencies.

There is little else to say than that this caliph continued to occupy a more or less independent position, with a vizier and courtly surroundings, and supported by only a small force sufficient for an occasional local campaign.

See also 
 Ar-Rashid bi-llāh 30th Abbasid Caliph and Cousin of Al-Mustanjid.
 Safiyya al-Baghdadiyya, 12th century Arabic poet

References

Sources
 
This text is adapted from William Muir's public domain, The Caliphate: Its Rise, Decline, and Fall.

1170 deaths
12th-century Abbasid caliphs
1124 births
Sons of Abbasid caliphs